Chondropomatus is a genus of land snails with an operculum, terrestrial gastropod mollusks in the family Pomatiidae.

Species 
Species within the genus Chondropomatus include:
Chondropomatus latum (Gundlach in Pfeiffer, 1858)
Chondropomatus mimetica (Henderson & Bartsch, 1941)

References 

Pomatiidae